Ambly des Ayvelles is the name of an extinct French noble family from the County of Champagne. They were first attested to in 1112, were recognized as counts in 1523, and as marquises in 1675. Following the French Revolution, members of the family emigrated to Austria and Prussia. In 1851, the German branches died out. The last Marquis, Charles François Louis d'Ambly, died in France, sometime after 1861.

References

European noble families
Austrian noble families
German noble families
Prussian nobility
French noble families